Federal Highway 69 (Carretera Federal 69) (Fed. 69) is a free (libre) part of the federal highways corridors (los corredores carreteros federales) of Mexico. The highway connects Fed. 70 in Rioverde, San Luis Potosí to Fed. 120 in Jalpan de Serra, Querétaro.

References

069
Transportation in Querétaro
Transportation in San Luis Potosí